O lucenti, o sereni occhi (HWV 144) is a dramatic secular cantata for soprano written by Georg Frideric Handel in 1707. Other catalogues of Handel's music have referred to the work as HG li, 28; (there is no HHA numbering). The title of the cantata translates as "O shining, o serene eyes".

History
Handel's original manuscript for the cantata has not survived, but a copy in the Santini Collection suggests that the work originated under the patronage of Ruspoli. The work can be dated to the spring or summer of 1707, and Handel reused aspects of the first aria in his opera Rodrigo in the same year.

Synopsis
Even though the work is performed by a female voice, the text does not reveal whether the "voice" is male or female. The first aria relates how beautiful eyes cause the singer to languish and die. The second aria tells how blazing eyes cause the singer both pleasure and pain.

Structure
The work is scored for solo soprano and keyboard (with figured bass markings). The cantata contains two recitative-aria pairings. The use of silence (with musical rests) is notable in the work.

A typical performance of the work takes about eight minutes.

Movements
The work consists of four movements:

(Movements do not contain repeat markings unless indicated. The number of bars is the raw number in the manuscript—not including repeat markings. The above is taken from volume 51, starting at page 28, of the Händel-Gesellschaft edition.)

See also
List of cantatas by George Frideric Handel

References

 

Cantatas by George Frideric Handel
1707 compositions